This list of straits is an appendix to the article strait. For "Strait of.." or for "The.. " see the first letter of the word which follows the article.

A
 Agate Pass – between Port Madison and mainland Kitsap County in Puget Sound
 Agattu Strait – between Attu Island and Agattu Island in the Alaskan Aleutians
 Akashi Strait – between the Japanese islands of Honshu and Awaji
 Alas Strait – between Lombok and Sumbawa in Indonesia
 Alor Strait – Lesser Sunda Islands in Indonesia
 Amchitka Pass – between the Rat Islands group to the west and the Delarof Islands to the east within the Alaskan Aleutians
 Anegada Passage – between the Virgin Islands and Anguilla
 Anguilla Channel – between Anguilla and Saint Martin
 Arthur Kill – between Staten Island and New Jersey
 Augusta's Strait – a.k.a. Dampier Strait (Indonesia), between the Raja Ampat islands of Waigeo and Batanta, within the Indonesian province of West Papua

B
 Bab-el-Mandeb – connects the Red Sea to the Gulf of Aden / Arabian Sea
 Bab Iskender – between Yemen on the Arabian Peninsula and Djibouti in Africa
 Balabac Strait – between Palawan, Philippines and Borneo
 Bali Strait – between the Indonesian islands of Java and Bali
 Strait of Baltiysk – between Vistula Bay and Gdańsk Bay
 Bangka Strait – between Sumatra and Bangka Island (also: Banca, Banka)
 Banks Strait – between Cape Barren Island/Clarke Island and Tasmania
 Bashi Channel – between Mavudis (also called Y'Ami Island), Philippines and Orchid Island, Taiwan
Basilan Strait - between Mindanao, Philippines and Basilan, Philippines.
 Bass Strait – between mainland Australia and Tasmania
 Beagle Channel – Tierra del Fuego
 Strait of Belle Isle – between Newfoundland and mainland Canada
 Bering Strait – between Asia and North America
 Boca Chica Pass – an historical strait between the Gulf of Mexico and the South Bay of the Laguna Madre
 Bohai Strait – between Bohai Sea and Yellow Sea
 Bohol Strait – a.k.a. Cebu Strait
 Strait of Bonifacio – between Corsica and Sardinia
 Bosporus – between Europe and Asia
 Bougainville Strait (Indonesia) – between Waigeo and the Kawe Islands
 Bougainville Strait (Solomon Islands) – between Bougainville Island and Choiseul Island
 Boundary Pass – between British Columbia and Washington state
 Bransfield Strait – between South Shetland Islands and Antarctic Peninsula
 Bungo Channel – between Kyūshū and Shikoku in Japan
 Burias Pass - between Bicol Peninsula and Burias Island

C
 Cabot Strait – between Newfoundland and Cape Breton Island
 Caicos Passage – between Turks and Caicos Islands and the Bahamas
 Strait of Canso – between Cape Breton Island and mainland Nova Scotia
 Carquinez Strait – connects San Pablo Bay and Suisun Bay, California
 Cebu Strait (a.k.a. Bohol Strait) – between Bohol and Cebu in the Philippines
 Chatham Strait – between Chichagof Island and Admiralty Island, Alaska
 Chios Strait – between Turkey and the Greek island Chios
 Clarence Strait – between Prince of Wales Island and mainland Alaska
 Coco Channel – between the Burmese Coco Islands and the Indian North Andaman Island
 Colvos Passage – Puget Sound
 Cook Strait – between the North Island and South Island of New Zealand
 Straits of Corfu – between the Greek island Corfu and mainland Greece/Albania
 Cozumel Channel – between Cozumel Island and the Yucatán Peninsula, Mexico
 Cross Sound – between Chichagof Island to its south and the mainland to its north, of Alaska
 Cumberland Sound – between Baffin Island's Hall Peninsula and the Cumberland Peninsula, in Canada

D
 Dalcahue Channel – between Quinchao Island and Chiloé Island
 Dalco Passage – Puget Sound
 Dampier Strait (Indonesia) – between Bird's Head Peninsula and Raja Ampat Islands
 Dampier Strait (Papua New Guinea) – between New Britain and Umboi Island
 Danish straits – collectively refers to the Danish straits Oresund, Fehmarn Belt, Little Belt and Great Belt between Scandinavia and Jutland
 Dardanelles – between Europe and Asia
 Davis Strait – between Baffin Island and Greenland
 Deception Pass – Puget Sound
 Denmark Strait – between Greenland and Iceland
 La Désirade Passage – Guadeloupe
 Detroit River – between Lake St. Clair and Lake Erie / and the province of Ontario, Canada, and the state of Michigan, USA (The word "détroit" is French for "strait")
 Dixon Entrance – between Alaska and British Columbia
 Dolphin and Union Strait – between Northwest Territories and Victoria Island
 Dominica Passage – between Dominica and Guadeloupe
 Strait of Dover – the narrowest part of the English Channel between Great Britain and France
 Dragon's Mouths (Bocas del Dragón) – between Trinidad and Venezuela
 Drake Passage – between South America and Antarctica

E
 East River – between Manhattan, the Bronx and Long Island
 Eastern Channel – between Korean Peninsula and the Iki Island
 English Channel – between Great Britain and France
 Euripus Strait – between the Island of Euboea and the Greek mainland on the Aegean

F
 Falkland Sound – between West Falkland and East Falkland
 Fehmarn Belt – between the German island Fehmarn and the Danish island Lolland
 Fehmarn Sound – between German island Fehmarn and the German mainland
 Fisher Strait – between Southampton Island (to the north-west) from Coats Island (to the south-east)
 Straits of Florida – between Florida and Cuba
 Formosa Strait – between Taiwan and the Chinese mainland
 Foveaux Strait – between the South Island and Stewart Island of New Zealand
 Foxe Channel – between the Foxe Basin (to the north) from Hudson Bay and the Hudson Strait (to the south) of Canada
 Freeman Strait – between Barentsøya and Edgeøya in Svalbard, Denmark
 Frozen Strait – between the Melville Peninsula to the north and Southampton Island to the south, in Canada
 Fury and Hecla Strait – between Baffin Island and Melville Peninsula

G
 Galowa Strait – a.k.a. Sele Strait
 Strait of Georgia – between Vancouver Island and mainland British Columbia, Canada
 Strait of Gibraltar – between Europe and Africa
 Golden Gate Strait – between Marin County, California and San Francisco – entrance to San Francisco Bay
 Great Belt – between the islands of Zealand and Funen in Denmark
 Guadeloupe Passage – north of Guadeloupe, West Indies
 Gulf of Corryvreckan - between the Scottish islands of Jura and Scarba
 Gulf of Mannar – between India and Sri Lanka
 Gulf Trough (a.k.a. Suwannee Strait) – (prehistoric)

H
 Hall Basin – between Ellesmere Island and Greenland
 Harlem River – between Manhattan and The Bronx
 Haro Straits – series of straits between British Columbia and Washington state
 Hecate Strait – between Haida Gwaii and British Columbia
 Honguedo Strait – between Anticosti Island and Gaspé Peninsula in Quebec
 Strait of Hormuz – between Oman and Iran
 Hōyo Strait – between Kyūshū and Shikoku in Japan
 Hudson Strait – between Baffin Island and Quebec

I
 Indispensable Strait – between Guadalcanal and Malaita in the Solomon Islands
 Irbe Strait – between Latvia and the island of Saaremaa in Estonia

J
 Jamaica Channel – between Jamaica and Hispaniola in the Caribbean
 Jildo Strait – somewhere around Waigeo (same as Jailolo Strait?)
 Johor Strait or Strait of Johor – between Singapore and the state of Johor of Malaysia
 Jones Sound – between t he Canadian islands of Devon Island and the southern end of Ellesmere Island
 Strait of Juan de Fuca – between Vancouver Island, Canada and Olympic Peninsula, United States

K
 Kalmar Strait – between Öland and Småland
 Kane Basin – between Ellesmere Island and Greenland
 Kanmon Strait – between Honshū and Kyūshū
 Kara Strait – between Novaya Zemlya and Vaygach Island in Russia
 Karimata Strait – between Sumatra and Borneo
 Kattegat – between Danish Jutland and Swedish Halland and neighboring provinces.
 Kerch Strait – between Crimea and Russia
 Kildin Strait – between Kildin Island and Kola Peninsula in Russia
 Kill Van Kull – between Staten Island and Bayonne, New Jersey
 Kitan Strait – between Awaji Island and the island Honshū in Japan
 Korea Strait – between Korea and Japan
 Gulf of Kuşadası – between Turkey and the Greek island Samos
 Kvarken – between Sweden and Finland
 Kwangtung Strait

L
 Lancaster Sound – between Canadian islands of Devon and Baffin
 Langeland's Belt – between Danish islands of Langeland and Lolland
 Lembeh Strait – between Sulawesi and Lembeh island in Indonesia
 Little Belt – between the island Funen and mainland Denmark
 Lombok Strait – between Bali and Lombok in Indonesia
 Luzon Strait – between Taiwan and Luzon, Philippines

M
 Straits of Mackinac – between Lake Michigan and Lake Huron / and between Michigan's Upper and Lower Peninsulas
 Main Channel – between Lake Huron and Georgian Bay / and between Ontario's Manitoulin Island and the Bruce Peninsula
 Strait of Magellan – between South America and Tierra del Fuego
 Makassar Strait – between Borneo and Sulawesi
 Malacca Strait or Strait of Malacca – between Peninsular Malaysia and Sumatra
 Maliku Kandu – Maldives
 Malta Channel – between Malta and Sicily
 Mare Island Strait – between Mare Island and mainland Solano County in California
 Marie-Galante Passage – Guadeloupe
 Martinique Channel – between Saint Vincent and the Grenadines and Grenada
 Maqueda Channel - between Luzon and Catanduanes, Philippines
 Martinique Passage – between Dominica and Martinique
 McClintock Strait between the Canadian islands of Victoria Island and Prince of Wales Island
 McClure Strait – Melville Island and Banks Island
 Menai Strait – between Anglesey and mainland Wales
 Strait of Messina – between Sicily and mainland Italy
 The Minch – between Outer Hebrides and mainland Scotland
 Mindoro Strait – between Mindoro and Palawan in the Philippines
 Mona Passage – between Hispaniola and Puerto Rico
 Myeongnyang Strait – between Jindo Island and mainland South Korea
 Mytilini Strait – between Turkey and the Greek island Lesbos

N
 Nares Strait – between Ellesmere Island and Northern Greenland and connects Baffin Bay with Lincoln Sea / the Arctic Sea
 The Narrows – between Staten Island and Brooklyn in New York City
 Naruto Strait – between Awaji Island and the island Shikoku in Japan
 Nemuro Strait – between Kunashir Island and the Shiretoko Peninsula in Hokkaidō, Japan
 Niagara River – between Lake Erie and Lake Ontario / and the province of Ontario, Canada, and the state of New York, USA
 Nicholas Channel – between Cuba and the Bahamas
 North Channel (British Isles) – between Northern Ireland and Scotland
 North Channel (Ontario)  – between Georgian Bay on the east, and St. Marys River on the west
 Northumberland Strait – between Prince Edward Island and New Brunswick/Nova Scotia

O
 Old Bahama Channel – between Cuba and the Bahamas
 Ombai Strait – Alor Archipelago, Indonesia
 Øresund – between Danish Zealand and Swedish Scania
 Strait of Otranto – between Italy and Albania

P
 Palk Strait – between India and Sri Lanka
 Panama – between North America and South America (Panama Canal)
 Parry Channel – between Baffin Bay in the east and Beaufort Sea in the west, of Canada
 Pearse Canal – between Alaska and islands of British Columbia
 Pentland Firth – between the Orkney archipelago and the mainland of Scotland
 La Pérouse Strait (also Soya Strait) – between Sakhalin and Japan
 Pertuis d'Antioche –  on the Atlantic coast of Western France
 Pickering Passage – Puget Sound
 Pitt Strait (Indonesia) (a.k.a. Sagewin Strait) – between Salawati and Batanta in Indonesia
 Pitt Strait (New Zealand) – between Chatham Island and Pitt Island in the Chatham Islands
 Polillo Strait - between Polillo Island and Luzon Island
 Port Washington Narrows – Puget Sound
 Porte des Morts – between Green Bay and Lake Michigan
 Prince of Wales Strait – between Banks Island and Victoria Island in Canada
 Prince Regent Inlet – between the west end of Baffin Island (Brodeur Peninsula) and Somerset Island on the west, of Canada

Q

 Qiongzhou Strait – between Hainan and Guangdong
 Queen Charlotte Strait – between Vancouver Island and the mainland of British Columbia, Canada

R
 Revenges Strait – a.k.a. Sele Strait
 Rich Passage – Puget Sound
 Robeson Channel – between Ellesmere Island and Greenland
 Roes Welcome Sound – between the mainland of Canada on the west and Southampton Island on the east

S
 Sagewin Strait – a.k.a. Pitt Strait (Indonesia)
 Saint-Barthélemy Channel – between Saint Barthélemy and Saint Martin
 St. Clair River – between Lake Huron and Lake St. Clair / and the province of Ontario, Canada, and the state of Michigan, USA
 St George's Channel – between Ireland and Wales
 St George's Channel – between New Britain and New Ireland in the Bismarck Archipelago
 Saint Lucia Channel – between Martinique and Saint Lucia
 St. Marys River – between Lake Superior and Lake Huron / and the province of Ontario, Canada, and the state of Michigan, USA
 Saint Vincent Passage – between Saint Vincent and Saint Lucia
 Les Saintes Passage – Guadeloupe
 Sakonnet River – between Aquidneck Island and Tiverton and Little Compton, Rhode Island.
 San Bernardino Strait – between Luzon and Samar in the Philippines
 San Juanico Strait – between Samar and Leyte islands in the Philippines
 Scapa Flow – between several of the Orkney islands
 Sele Strait (a.k.a. Galowa Strait, Revenges Strait) – between Salawati and New Guinea
 Serpent's Mouth (Boca de la Serpiente) – between Trinidad and Venezuela
 Shelikof Strait – between the Alaska mainland to the west and Kodiak and Afognak islands to the east, in the USA
 Sibutu Passage – between Borneo and the Sulu Archipelago
 Strait of Sicily – between Sicily and Africa
 Singapore Strait – between Singapore and Indonesia (Sumatra)
 Skagerrak – separating Denmark from Norway and Sweden
 Smith Sound – between Ellesmere Island and Greenland
 The Solent – between the Isle of Wight and southern Great Britain
 The Sound or Øresund – between Denmark and Sweden
 South Kvarken – between the Finnish Åland and Sweden
 Soya Strait or La Pérouse Strait –  dividing Sakhalin (Karafuto) from Hokkaidō
 Sula Channel - connects Albay Gulf to Pacific Ocean
 Sumba Strait – between Flores and Sumba, Indonesia
 Sunda Strait – between Sumatra and Java
 Surigao Strait – between Leyte and Mindanao islands in the Philippines
 Suwannee Strait (prehistoric) – a.k.a. Gulf Trough
 Svinesund – between Norway and Sweden
 The Swale – between the Isle of Sheppey and southern Great Britain

T
 Tablas Strait – between Mindoro and Panay islands in the Philippines
 Tacoma Narrows – Puget Sound
 Taiwan Strait – between Taiwan and Mainland China
 Tanon Strait – between Negros and Cebu islands in the Philippines
 Strait of Tartary (also Mamiya Strait and Strait of Nevelskoi) – Sakhalin
 Strait of Tebrau – between Peninsular Malaysia and Singapore
 Ticao Pass - separates Ticao Island from the Bicol Peninsula in the Philippines.
 Strait of Tiran – between the Sinai peninsula and Saudi Arabia
 Tolo Channel – narrow opening to the Tolo Harbour in Hong Kong
 Tongass Passage – between Alaska and British Columbia
 Torres Strait – between New Guinea and Australia
 Tsugaru Strait – between Hokkaidō and Honshū
 Turkish Straits – collectively refers to the Turkish straits the Bosphorus and the Dardanelles between Asia and Europe

V
 Viscount Melville Sound – between the Canadian islands of Victoria Island and Prince of Wales Island and the Queen Elizabeth Islands
 Vitiaz Strait – between New Guinea and Long Island

W
 Wantsum Channel – former channel between the Isle of Thanet and the mainland of southern England; now drained, and Thanet now only separated from the mainland by the River Wantsum, a minor drainage channel
 Wetar Strait – between Timor and the Indonesian island of Wetar
 Windward Passage – between Cuba and Hispaniola

Y
 Yucatán Channel – between Mexico and Cuba

See also
 Intercontinental and transoceanic fixed links
Floating suspension bridge

References

Straits
Straits